Michael Skubala (born 31 October 1982) is an English football coach who is the first team coach for Premier League club Leeds United.

Career
Skubala began his career in 2005 working at Lutterworth College in Leicestershire. Alongside his job at the school, he had a number of coaching jobs including assistant manager at county club Barwell and in the academies of Coventry City and Nottingham Forest. At the same time, he was head futsal coach at Loughborough University, before subsequently breaking into the FA’s set-up, where he became head coach for England national futsal team between 2017 and 2021, guiding them to their highest world ranking in two decades.

In July 2022, he was appointed head coach of Leeds United F.C. Reserves and Youth Team.

In February 2023, Skubala was appointed co-interim head coach of English Premier League side Leeds United, alongside coaches Paco Gallardo and Chris Armas after the sacking of Head Coach Jesse Marsch.

After drawing their first game away at Manchester United, it was announced that Skubala would remain in charge for a second match. The club announced he would continue in the role whilst the search for a permanent manager continued, and Skubala said he did not see the temporary role as an 'opportunity' for him.

After the appointment of Javi Gracia as head coach, Skubala was promoted to first-team coach at Leeds.

Managerial statistics

References

External links

 

1982 births
Living people
English football managers
Coventry City F.C. non-playing staff
Nottingham Forest F.C. non-playing staff
Leeds United F.C. non-playing staff
Leeds United F.C. managers
Premier League managers
English educators